Bozouls is a commune in the Aveyron department in southern France.

It is located on Route Maquis de Jean Pierre (D20) thirty minutes from Rodez, one hour from the Gorges du Tarn, two hours northeast of Toulouse, and six and a half hours due south of Paris.

It sits on the edge of a gorge created by the river Dourdou de Conques.

Population

Notable people and residents in Bozouls

 Richard Belzer - American actor

See also
Communes of the Aveyron department

References

External links
Official Web site

Communes of Aveyron
Aveyron communes articles needing translation from French Wikipedia